Blister beetles are beetles of the family Meloidae, so called for their defensive secretion of a blistering agent, cantharidin. About 7,500 species are known worldwide. Many are conspicuous and some are aposematically colored, announcing their toxicity to would-be predators.

Description

Blister beetles are hypermetamorphic, going through several larval stages, the first of which is typically a mobile triungulin. The larvae are insectivorous, mainly attacking bees, though a few feed on grasshopper eggs. While sometimes considered parasitoids, in general, the meloid larva apparently consumes the immature host along with its provisions, and can often survive on the provisions alone; thus it is not an obligatory parasitoid, but rather a facultative parasitoid, or simply a kleptoparasite. The adults sometimes feed on flowers and leaves of plants of such diverse families as the Amaranthaceae, Asteraceae, Fabaceae, and Solanaceae.

Cantharidin, a poisonous chemical that causes blistering of the skin, is secreted as a defensive agent. It is used medically to remove warts and is collected for this purpose from species of the genera Mylabris and Lytta, especially Lytta vesicatoria, better known as "Spanish fly".

Toxicity
Cantharidin is the principal irritant in "Spanish fly", a folk medicine prepared from dried beetles in the family Meloidae.

The largest genus, Epicauta, contains many species toxic to horses. A few beetles consumed in a single feeding of alfalfa hay may be lethal. In semiarid areas of the western United States, modern harvesting techniques may contribute to cantharidin content in harvested forage. The practice of hay conditioning, crushing the stalks to promote drying, also crushes any beetles present and causes the release of cantharidin into the fodder. Blister beetles are attracted to alfalfa and weeds during bloom. Reducing weeds and timing harvests before and after bloom are sound management practices. Using equipment without hay conditioners may reduce beetle mortality and allow them to escape before baling.

Evolutionary history 
The family is thought to have begun diversifying during the Early Cretaceous. The oldest fossil of the group is a larva (triangulin) found phoretic on a schizopterid bug from the mid Cretaceous Burmese amber, dated to around 99 million years ago.

Systematics

Subfamily Eleticinae
Tribe Derideini
Anthicoxenus
Deridea
Iselma
Iselmeletica
Tribe Morphozonitini
Ceriselma
Morphozonitis
Steniselma

Tribe Eleticini
Eletica
Tribe Spasticini
Eospasta
Protomeloe
Spastica
Xenospasta

Subfamily Meloinae

Tribe Cerocomini
Anisarthrocera
Cerocoma
Diaphorocera
Rhampholyssa
Rhampholyssodes
Tribe Epicautini
Denierella
Epicauta
Linsleya
Psalydolytta

Tribe Eupomphini
Cordylospasta
Cysteodemus
Eupompha
Megetra
Phodaga
Pleropasta
Tegrodera

Tribe Lyttini
Acrolytta
Afrolytta
Alosimus
Berberomeloe
Cabalia
Dictyolytta
Eolydus
Epispasta
Lagorina
Lydomorphus
Lydulus
Lydus
Lytta
Lyttolydulus
Lyttonyx
Megalytta
Muzimes
Oenas
Parameloe
Paroenas
Physomeloe
Prionotolytta
Prolytta
Pseudosybaris
Sybaris
Teratolytta
Tetraolytta
Trichomeloe

Tribe Meloini
Cyaneolytta
Lyttomeloe
Meloe
Spastomeloe
Spastonyx
Tribe Mylabrini
Actenodia

Ceroctis
Croscherichia
Hycleus
Lydoceras
Mimesthes
Mylabris
Paractenodia
Pseudabris
Semenovilia
Xanthabris

Tribe Pyrotini
Bokermannia
Brasiliota
Denierota
Glaphyrolytta
Lyttamorpha
Picnoseus
Pseudopyrota
Pyrota
Wagneronota
Genera incertae sedis
Australytta
Calydus
Gynapteryx
Oreomeloe
Pseudomeloe

Subfamily Nemognathinae

Tribe Horiini
Cissites
Horia
Synhoria
Tribe Nemognathini
Cochliophorus
Euzonitis
Gnathium
Gnathonemula
Leptopalpus
Megatrachelus
Nemognatha
Palaestra
Palaestrida
Pseudozonitis
Rhyphonemognatha
Stenodera
Zonitis
Zonitodema
Zonitolytta
Zonitomorpha
Zonitoschema

Tribe Sitarini
Allendeselazaria
Apalus
Ctenopus
Glasunovia
Nyadatus
Sitaris
Sitarobrachys
Stenoria
Genera incertae sedis
Hornia
Onyctenus
Sitaromorpha
Tricrania

Subfamily Tetraonycinae
Tribe Tetraonycini
Meloetyphlus
Opiomeloe
Tetraonyx

See also 
 Blister beetle dermatitis
 Cantarella

References

External links

Blister Beetle Intoxication: Cantharidin Poisoning
meloidae.com
blister beetles UF / IFAS Featured Creatures
striped blister beetle, Epicauta vittata UF / IFAS Featured Creatures
 Beetle mania as 'extinct' insect found on Scots isle
 Ever so Strange: Blister Beetles 
Mylabris Pustulata Orange Blister Beetle found in Farms near Nagpur, Maharashtra, India

 
Poisonous animals
Insect common names